Clepsis soriana is a species of moth of the family Tortricidae. It is found in Lebanon and Palestine.

References

Moths described in 1899
Clepsis